Nandigram is a census town in the Nandigram I Community Development Block of the Haldia subdivision in the Purba Medinipur district of the Indian state of West Bengal.

Nandigram may also refer to:
 Nandigram I, a community development block in Haldia subdivision of Purba Medinipur, West Bengal, India
 Nandigram II, a community development block in Haldia subdivision of Purba Medinipur, West Bengal, India
 Nandigram (Vidhan Sabha constituency), an assembly constituency in Purba Medinipur, West Bengal, India
 Nandigram violence, violent protests against government land acquisition in West Bengal, India in 2007
 Nandigram Express, a railway service in India
 Nandigram Upazila,  an upazila of Bogra District in the Division of Rajshahi, Bangladesh
 Nandigram (Bharat Kund), a village in Sohawal tehsil, Uttar Pradesh, India
 Nandigrama, a place in western India known for a school of 13th-18th century astronomer-mathematicians